Francisco Contreras (24 May 1904 – 17 March 1949) was a Mexican hurdler. He competed in the men's 110 metres hurdles at the 1924 Summer Olympics.

References

External links
 

1904 births
1949 deaths
Athletes (track and field) at the 1924 Summer Olympics
Mexican male hurdlers
Mexican male long jumpers
Olympic athletes of Mexico
Place of birth missing